The Convention on the recognition of registered partnerships is a multilateral convention, drafted by the International Commission on Civil Status which provides the acceptance in other countries of any form of registered partnership, which is not a marriage Parties to the convention should recognize the partnership, as well as the consequences regarding name change not only towards other state parties, but with regards to partnerships in any state. The partnership can be between partners of the same or of opposite sex.

Reservations
State parties can make reservations regarding
applicability to persons of the opposite sex
acceptance of partnerships of any state (rather than states parties to the treaty)
the consequences regarding name changes

Member states and signatories 
The convention has been ratified only by Spain and has been signed only by Spain and Portugal. Having not been ratified by two states, it therefore has not entered into force.

See also 
 International Commission on Civil Status

References

External links 
 treaty text (English translation)
 ratifications and signatories

Family law treaties
Human rights instruments
recognition of registered partnerships
recognition of registered partnerships
International Commission on Civil Status treaties
Treaties of Spain
Marriage, unions and partnerships in Spain